GBY refer to:
 Daughters of Jacob Bridge (Hebrew: , Gesher Bnot Ya'akov)
 Gwari language